Ministry of Education, Science and Technology may refer to:

 Ministry of Education, Science and Technology (Kenya)
 Ministry of Education, Science and Technology (Kosovo)
 Ministry of Education, Science and Technology (Nepal)
 Ministry of Education, Science and Technology (South Korea)
 Ministry of Education, Science and Technology (South Sudan)

See also
 Ministry of Education, Culture, Sports, Science and Technology, Japan
 Ministry of Education (Science and Technology), Myanmar
 Ministry of Education, Science and Technological Development (Serbia)